Silver Creek is an unincorporated community in Marshall and Maury counties, in the U.S. state of Tennessee. A variant name was "Silvercreek".

History
A post office called Silver Creek was established in 1860, and remained in operation until 1935. Besides the post office, the community had a country store.

References

Unincorporated communities in Marshall County, Tennessee
Unincorporated communities in Maury County, Tennessee
Unincorporated communities in Tennessee